King Neptune is a large bronze statue located in Virginia Beach, Virginia designed by Paul DiPasquale. This statue stands at the front of Neptune park, and depicts the mythological god Neptune and is located at the entrance of Neptune Park on the Virginia Beach Boardwalk at 31st Street. It was built and opened in 2005. The design consists of a 12-foot tall rock base surrounded by various fish, dolphins, lobsters, and octopuses. Above this base, the figure of Neptune begins, starting with his waist. Neptune holds a trident in his right hand and rests his left hand on a loggerhead turtle.

Design and creation
In 2003, the Neptune Festival requested submission designs for a statue. Cameron Kitchin, the Director of the Contemporary Arts Center of Virginia Beach (now known as Virginia Museum of Contemporary Art) asked DiPasquale to submit his design of a statue of King Neptune.  DiPasquale sent the clay model to the Festival's sculpture committee.   After approval and years of planning, the statue was cast in China by Zhang Cong, who used traditional local methods.

Upon arriving in the United States, the three pieces needed interior support before being reassembled. Due to exceeding its budget, the Chinese manufacturers inserted a weak metal to support the statue.  This material was cleared out and substituted by a stainless steel skeletal support.  According to DiPasquale, replacing the interior and reorganizing the individual pieces together required a month and a half of welding.

The statue was dedicated to the City of Virginia Beach on September 30, 2005, during the Neptune Festival Boardwalk Weekend.

In 2015, the  7 foot maquette that served as a model for the sculpture was donated for display at the Cape Charles boardwalk.

References

2005 establishments in Virginia
2005 sculptures
Buildings and structures in Virginia Beach, Virginia
Culture of Virginia Beach, Virginia
Statues in Virginia
Sculptures of men in Virginia
Animals in art
Fish in art
Sculptures of turtles
Marine art
Outdoor sculptures in Virginia
Sculptures of Neptune
History of Virginia Beach, Virginia
Crustaceans in art
Dolphins in art